Lethotremus muticus, also known as the docked snailfish (a somewhat misleading name as this species is not one of the true snailfish in the family Liparidae), is a species of lumpfish native to the Northeast Pacific. It is known from the Bering Sea and the Aleutian Islands, where its range extends to Unimak Pass, and it occurs at a depth range of 58 to 330 m (190 to 1082 ft). It is a benthic species that reaches 11.5 cm (4.5 inches) in total length. It can be found on substrates of mud, rock, or gravel, and it is currently the only known species of Lethotremus, following a reclassification of the second described species in the genus as Eumicrotremus awae.

References 

Cyclopteridae
Fish described in 1896
Fish of the North Pacific
Taxa named by Charles Henry Gilbert